UGC 12158 or PGC 69533 is an Sb-type barred spiral galaxy located approximately   away from Earth in the constellation of Pegasus. It is also often stated to resemble the Milky Way in appearance, with a similar central bar and spiral arm structure.

2003 Supernova
On 15 December 2003, a 19.2v magnitude Type Ia supernova, was recorded on one of the spiral arms near the apparent centre in UGC 12158, and was designated as SN 2004EF. (Blue star within UGC 12158 in Starbox Hubble's Space Telescope image.) It reached 17.5v magnitude on 4 September 2004 before fading from view.
 Optical spectra was obtained on 7 September 2014 confirming the Type I classification. No progenitor star was found on earlier survey images.

See also 

 NGC 2336 - another spiral galaxy of similar size and shape
 NGC 1232
 NGC 6744
 SPT0418-47 - a spiral galaxy of similar size and shape when universe was 1.4 billion years old

References

External links
 
 Barred spiral bares all
 The Milky Way's (almost) identical twin

12158
Pegasus (constellation)
Barred spiral galaxies
69533